Tryptych is a compilation album by Demdike Stare, released on January 24, 2011 by Modern Love Records. It compiles the group's 2010 releases, including Forest of Evil, Liberation Through Hearing and Voices of Dust.

Track listing

Personnel
Adapted from the Tryptych liner notes.

Demdike Stare
 Sean Canty – producer
 Miles Whittaker – producer

Production and additional personnel
 Radu Prepeleac – design
 Andy Votel – cover art

Release history

References

External links 
 

2011 compilation albums
Demdike Stare albums
Instrumental compilation albums
Modern Love Records albums